"Somewhere in Your Heart" is a song by American singer Frank Sinatra, which was a hit in 1965.

Charts

References

External links 
 

1965 songs
1965 singles
Frank Sinatra songs